Meeku Meere Maaku Meme is a 2016 Telugu language film directed by Hussainsha Kiran. It stars Tarun Shetty and Avantika Mishra.

Cast

Tarun Shetty as Aadi
Avantika Mishra as Priya
Swaraj Rebbapragada as Priya's father
Kireeti Damaraju as Kireeti
Jenny Honey
Bharan Kumar

Reviews

The Times of India gave 2.5 out of 5 stars concluding it's easy-to-watch film. 123telugu gave 2.75 out of 5 stars praising the debutante director attempt.

References

External links 
 

2010s Telugu-language films